Allison Argo (born December 23, 1953) is an American film producer, director, writer, editor, and narrator. She is best known for her documentaries that focus on endangered wildlife and conservation. Her films have received awards including six National Emmy Awards. and the duPont-Columbia Award for journalism.

In her early career as an actress, Argo performed on Broadway, in television, and in film. Her theatre roles included work as an original cast member in two Broadway theatre productions, and her work in television and film included roles in television movies and a major role in a TV series, along with recurring roles in two soap operas.

In 1989, while on location in the state of Washington, Argo happened upon a gorilla caged as an exhibit in a shopping mall. This experience led Argo to produce and direct her first film, The Urban Gorilla (National Geographic 1992), about the lives of captive gorillas.  Argo received the duPont-Columbia award for the documentary. Since that time, Argo has dedicated her work towards advocating for the welfare and understanding of wild animals through documentary films and public speaking engagements.

With her production company, ArgoFilms, LTD, Argo has produced eighteen films. Among others, notable award-winning films have included Keepers of the Wild (National Geographic and PBS 1992), The Last Frog (National Geographic 1996), The Secret Life of Cats (National Geographic 1999), The Urban Elephant (National Geographic and PBS NATURE 2000), Chimpanzees: An Unnatural History (PBS NATURE 2006), Crash: a Tale of Two Species (PBS NATURE 2008), and Parrot Confidential (PBS NATURE 2013), The Last Pig (2017).

Early life
Argo was raised on Cape Cod as one of two daughters of Gordon Harold Argo (06/22/1924–07/10/2003) and Elizabeth "Betsy" Argo (née Brunk; 1922-2016), both actors. The Argos owned and operated the Orleans Arena Theater, America's first summer stock theater-in-the-round, in the town of Orleans, Massachusetts. From childhood, she was immersed in theater and the world of drama, which prepared her for a career as a professional actress in New York and Los Angeles.

Career as an actress
On Broadway, Argo played major roles as an original cast member in the revivals of Ibsen’s The Lady from the Sea (1976), and Tennessee Williams’ The Night of the Iguana (1976–1977), and she appeared in the musical Grease. She played a leading role on the CBS television series Ladies Man and was featured on WKRP in Cincinnati, as well as on ten television movies and pilots. Argo played recurring roles on the soap operas Search for Tomorrow and The Bold and the Beautiful. She also voiced cartoon characters, including the character Andrea in the Cathy animated television specials.

ArgoFilms

Argo's experience seeing the gorilla, Ivan, isolated and on display in an enclosure comprising two concrete rooms in a shopping mall was the catalyst for her  forming ArgoFilms, LTD. Concerned about gorillas in similar situations as Ivan's, Argo made them the subject of her first film The Urban Gorilla, which in addition to the duPont-Columbia award was the recipient of two Emmy nominations.

Since The Urban Gorilla, ArgoFilms has gone on to advocate for, among others, frogs, snakes, cats, elephants, chimpanzees, and birds. One film has documented the effects of the September 11 attacks upon people. The Story of Dao, about a street elephant named Pang Dao, has been in pre-production since 2011. A scout (research expedition) was completed in Thailand in 2012.

ArgoFilms has produced eighteen documentaries for National Geographic, PBS, and the NATURE series. Allison Argo has either produced, directed, or written all films. Glenn Close narrated the first two films; and Argo has narrated since. The films have garnered twelve Emmy nominations, with six Emmys having been won in various categories including two for directing. Additionally, ArgoFilms has been awarded four Genesis Awards, most recently in 2014 for the film Parrot Confidential ( PBS NATURE 2013), and has also been recognized by the Missoula, Jackson Hole, and Japan Wildlife Film Festivals. In Parrot Confidential, the circumstances of parrots in captivity who often outlive their owners and suffer as a result are explored. The subject had received little documentation until the film was produced.

In an April 2014 article in a Cape Cod periodical, Argo has said that the most satisfying aspect of her work is when it makes a difference. Her goal is to open eyes; and if people are given the facts, they will do what they can to improve life. The work of ArgoFilms is meant to "foster compassion for animals and to champion wildlife through film, providing a voice for those who have none."

Stage acting credits (Broadway)

Television acting credits

Filmography, awards, and nominations

As producer, director, writer, or editor

References

External links
 ArgoFilms website
  (entry "I", missing "Writer/Producer/Director" details)
  (entry "II", missing "Actor" details)

1953 births
American documentary filmmakers
People from Orleans, Massachusetts
Living people
Writers from Richmond, Virginia
American women documentary filmmakers
Film directors from Virginia
Film directors from Massachusetts
21st-century American women